Bad Moon is a 1996 Canadian-American horror film written and directed by Eric Red, and produced by James G. Robinson. The film is about a mother and son who are threatened by her brother, who struggles to overcome the curse of lycanthropy. It stars Michael Paré, Mariel Hemingway and Mason Gamble.

The film is based on the novel Thor by Wayne Smith, which mainly tells the story from the dog's viewpoint. Thor was published in the United States (Thomas Dunne/St. Martin's Press hardback, Ballantine paperback), and in the United Kingdom, Germany, the Netherlands, Sweden and Norway, in English, German, Dutch, Swedish and Norwegian. Bad Moon received negative reviews and performed poorly at the box office.

Plot
During a work expedition in Nepal, photo-journalists Ted Harrison and his girlfriend Marjorie are attacked by a werewolf. The werewolf snatches Marjorie and Ted attempts to rescue her but gets bitten in the shoulder. He manages to kill the werewolf with his shotgun, but not before it kills Marjorie.

Seeking isolation, Ted moves into a trailer in the woods. Eventually, he invites his sister, Janet, and his nephew, Brett, to a meal at his home by the lake. Upon seeing him, the family dog, Thor, runs into the woods. Picking up a scent, Thor is led to human remains hanging from a tree branch. Meanwhile, Ted lies to Janet, telling her that Marjorie left him and went back to Seattle. Janet invites him to stay with them but he declines and insists they leave before sunset.

The next day, authorities investigate the remains of several missing hikers and a Forest Ranger, found in the woods near Ted’s trailer. Fearful of being found guilty, Ted calls Janet and accepts her offer. Upon arrival, Thor is again suspicious of Ted and acts hostile towards him. Later that evening, Thor follows Ted into the woods and finds him turned into a werewolf and handcuffed to a tree. Meanwhile, Janet goes into the woods looking for Thor. Aware of the danger, Thor leads her safely back to the house.

The next morning, Janet sees a news report of the killings and confronts her brother about not telling her his motive for accepting her invitation and asks him to stay permanently. Ted tries to warn her by advising she pay attention to Thor’s sudden behavior changes. He also hints that the murders had been done by a wolf. She ignores him. Later, as the sun sets, he leaves his trailer in hopes of chaining himself up again. Thor, knowing what is happening, barks until Brett lets him out of the house. He runs to the woods to find that Ted was too late in handcuffing himself. Thor follows Ted’s trail back to the backyard and Ted attacks him but the dog fights back. Janet wakes up and turns on the deck lights, scaring Ted away. She sees an injured Thor and calls the Sheriff; however, when she goes to Ted's trailer to tell him, she finds a book about werewolves, with gruesome pictures of Marjorie's body and some of Ted's victims attached to it. She also finds a journal in which Ted details his turmoil with not finding a cure for his "disease” and his hopes of finding peace near his family. Later that night, the traveling salesman who had previously tried to frame Thor for an attack, returns to Janet’s yard with the intention of killing Thor, but is instead fatally wounded by Ted.

The sheriff questions Janet about Thor and informs her of the salesman being attacked by a wild animal; his mutilated body was found near her property. She asks if it could have been a wolf, but the sheriff dismisses it and advises her to send Thor to the dog pound. Not believing Thor could be the killer, she confronts Ted, who provokes Thor to attack him. As a result, Thor is taken to the pound. Ted urinates on Thor's doghouse and is hostile towards Brett.

That night, Janet confronts Ted in the woods. He accuses her of not listening to his warnings and knowing the truth all along. As he transforms, she flees back to the house and retrieves a revolver hidden in the kitchen. Meanwhile, Brett manages to sneak out and free Thor from the dog pound. Thor returns home just as Ted is about to attack Janet. A vicious fight ensues, ending with Ted throwing Thor across the room, seemingly killing him. Brett, having returned home, is nearly strangled by Ted, but Janet fires several rounds into him. Then, Thor throws himself at Ted, knocking them both through the window and into the yard. Ted, severely injured, retreats into the woods, but Thor tracks him until sunrise. Ted, now human, emerges from behind a tree and tells a reluctant Thor to "do it.” Thor kills Ted. After, Janet apologizes to Thor for taking him to the pound. Suddenly, Thor as a werewolf growls at her, but it turns out to be a nightmare; Janet, Brett, and Thor are healing from their ordeal.

Cast
Michael Paré as Ted Harrison
Mason Gamble as Brett Harrison
Mariel Hemingway as Janet Harrison
Ken Pogue as Sheriff Jenson
Hrothgar Mathews as Jerry Mills
Johanna Lebovitz as Marjorie
Gavin Buhr as forest ranger
Julia Montgomery Brown as reporter
Primo as Thor

Reception

Critical response
Bad Moon received mostly negative reviews from critics upon its initial release. 

Mick LaSalle of the San Francisco Chronicle was highly critical of the film, panning the film's script, poor special effects, and unconvincing monster costume. Joe Leydon from Variety felt that the film was "too silly to be suspenseful, yet not quite awful enough or intentionally funny enough to qualify as camp", and criticized Hemingway's performance as being unconvincing. The Austin Chronicles Marc Savlov gave the film one and a half out of five stars, highlighting the film's direction, unconvincing special effects and monster costume, and unbelievable characters.

Home Media
The film was released on DVD in a snap case on October 3, 2000. It was released for the first time on Blu-ray on July 19, 2016.

See also

References

External links 
 
 
 
 

1996 films
1996 horror films
1990s monster movies
English-language Canadian films
Canadian supernatural horror films
American monster movies
Films about dogs
Films based on horror novels
Films directed by Eric Red
Films shot in Vancouver
Morgan Creek Productions films
Warner Bros. films
Canadian werewolf films
Films scored by Daniel Licht
1990s English-language films
1990s American films
1990s Canadian films